Dipsas maxillaris, Werner's thirst snake,  is a non-venomous snake found in Mexico.

References

Dipsas
Snakes of North America
Endemic fauna of Mexico
Reptiles of Mexico
Reptiles described in 1910
Taxa named by Franz Werner